Malet is a French surname. Notable people with the surname include:

 Albert Malet (historian) (1864–1915), French historian and author of scholarly manuals
 Albert Malet (painter) (1912–1986), French painter
 Alexander Malet (1800–1886), English diplomat and writer
 André Malet (abbot) (1862–1936), abbot of the Trappist abbey of Sainte-Marie-du-Désert at Bellegarde-Sainte-Marie
 André Malet (philosopher) (died 1989), Catholic priest who became a Unitarian Protestant
 Antoni Malet, Catalan historian of mathematics and professor of history of science
 Arthur Malet (1927–2013), British actor
 Claude François de Malet (1754–1812), general of the First French Empire, organiser of coup d'état against Napoleon
 Elizabeth Malet (1651–1681), English heiress, Countess of Rochester
 Frederick de Carteret Malet (1837–1912), New Zealand leader in business, church, and educational matters
 Guy Seymour Warre Malet (1900–1973), English artist
 Jean-Roland Malet (1675–1736), French historian and economist
 Joan Malet (c.1510–1549), Catalan witch-hunter
 John Malet (1623–1686), English lawyer, MP for Minehead and Bridgwater, son of Thomas
 John Malet (died 1570), English landowner, MP for Plymouth and Bodmin
 John Malet (died 1644), English landowner, MP for Bath
 Laurent Malet (born 1955), French actor
 Léo Malet (1909–1996), French writer
 Lucas Malet, pseudonym of Mary St Leger Kingsley (1852–1931), English novelist
 Michael Malet (c.1632 – after 1683), English lawyer and politician, son of Thomas
 Oriel Malet, pseudonym of Welsh author Lady Auriel Rosemary Malet Vaughan (1923–2014)
 Pierre Antoine Anselme Malet (1778–1815), soldier, maréchal de camp and général de brigade
 Pierre Malet (born 1955), French actor
 Robert Malet, 12th-century Norman-English baron
 Rosa Maria Malet (born 1948), Spanish art historian and museum director
 Thierry Malet, French composer of film music
 Thomas Malet (1582–1665), English judge and politician
 William Malet (companion of William the Conqueror) (died 1071), Norman lord who fought in the Battle of Hastings
 William Malet (exile) (died c. 1121), Norman lord who forfeited his English lands and was banished from England
 William Malet (Magna Carta baron) (fl. 1195–1215), a guarantor of Magna Carta
 The Malet baronets, including:
 Sir Charles Malet, 1st Baronet (1752–1815), British East India Company official
 Sir Alexander Malet, 2nd Baronet (1800–1886), diplomat and writer
 Sir Edward Baldwin Malet, 4th Baronet (1837–1908), diplomat

See also
Malet Lambert (disambiguation)
Mallett, a surname
Mallette, a surname
 Mallet (surname)
 Mallet (disambiguation)

French-language surnames